In system theory. "differentiation" is the increase of subsystems in a modern society to increase the complexity of a society. Each subsystem can make different connections with other subsystems, and this leads to more variation within the system in order to respond to variation in the environment. 

Differentiation that leads to more variation allows for better responses to the environment, and also for faster evolution (or perhaps sociocultural evolution), which is defined sociologically as a process of selection from variation; the more differentiation (and thus variation) that is available, the better the selection.

Introduction

Talcott Parsons was the first major theorist to develop a theory of society consisting of functionally defined sub-system, which emerges from an evolutionary point of view through a cybernetic process of differentiation. Niklas Luhmann, who studied under Talcott Parsons, took the latter's model and changed it in significant ways. Parsons regarded society as the combined activities of its subsystems within the logic of a cybernetic hierarchy. For Parsons, although each subsystem (e.g. his classical quadripartite AGIL scheme or AGIL paradigm) would tend to have self-referential tendencies and follow a related path of structural differentiation, it would occur in a constant interpenetrative communication with the other subsystems and the historical equilibrium between the interpenetrative balance between various subsystem would termine the relative degree in which the structural differentiation between subsystem would occur or not. In contrast to Luhmann, Parsons would highlight that although each subsystem had self-referential capacities and had an internal logic of this own (ultimately located in the pattern maintenance of each system) in historical reality, the actual interaction, communication and mutual enable-ness between the subsystems was crucial not only for each subsystem but for the overall development of the social system (and/or "society"). In actual history, Parsons maintained that the relative historical strength of various subsystems (including the interpenetrative equilibrium of each subsystem's subsystems) could either block or promote the forces of system-differentiation. Generally, Parsons was of the opinion that the main "gatekeeper" blocking-promoting question was to be found in the historical codification of the cultural system, including "cultural traditions" (which Parsons in general regarded as a part of the so-called "fiduciary system" (which facilitated the normatively defining epicenter of the communication and historical mode of institutionalization between cultural and social system). (For example, the various way Islam has been transferred as a cultural pattern into various social systems (Egypt, Iran, Tunisia, Yemen, Pakistan, Indonesia etc.) depend on the particular way in which the core Islamic value-symbols has been codified within each particular fiduciary system (which again depend on a serie of various societal and history-related factors)). Within the realm of the cultural traditions Parsons focused particular on the influence of the major world-religions yet he also maintain that in the course of the general rationalization process of the world and the related secularization process, the value-scheme structure of the religious and "magic" systems would stepwise be "transformed" into political ideologies, market doctrines, folklore systems, social lifestyles and aesthetic movements (and so on). This transformation Parsons maintain was not so much the destruction of the religious value-schemes (although such a process could also occur) but was generally the way in which "religious" (and in a broader sense "constitutive") values would tend to move from a religious-magic and primordial "representation" to one which was more secularized and more "modern" in its institutionalized and symbolistic expression; this again would coincide with the increasing relative independence of systems of expressive symbolization vis-a-vis cognitive and evaluative lines of differentiation (for example, the flower-power movement in the 60s and early 70s would be a particular moment in this increased impact on factors of expressive symbolization on the overall interpenetrative mode of the social system. The breakthrough of rock music in the 1950s and the sensual expressiveness of Elvis would be another example, for the way in which expressive symbolization would tend to increase its impact vis-a-vis other factors of system-differentiation, which again according to Parsons was a part of the deeper evolutionary logic, which in part was related to the increased impact of the goal-attachment function of the cultural system and at the same time related the increased factor of institutionalized individualism, which have become a fundamental feature for historical modernity). Luhmann tend to claim that each subsystem has autopoeitic "drives" of their own. Instead of reducing society as a whole to one of its subsystems, i.e.; Karl Marx and Economics, or Hans Kelsen and Law, Luhmann bases his analysis on the idea that society is a self differentiating system that will, in order to attain mastery over an environment that is always more complex than it, increase its own complexity through a proliferating of subsystems. Although Luhmann claims that society cannot be reduced to any one of its subsystems, his critics maintain that his autopoeitic assumptions make it impossible to "constitute" a society at all and that Luhmann's theory is inherently self-contradictory. "Religion" is more extensive than the church, "politics" transcends the governmental apparatus, and "economics" encompasses more than the sum total of organizations of production.

There are four types of differentiation: segmentation, stratification, center-periphery, and functional.

Niklas Luhmann 

Niklas Luhmann (1927–1998) was a German sociologist and "social systems theorist", as well as one of the most prominent modern day thinkers in the sociological systems theory. Luhmann was born in Lüneburg, Germany, studied law at the University of Freiburg from 1946 to 1949, in 1961 he went to Harvard, where he met and studied under Talcott Parsons, then the world's most influential social systems theorist. In later years, Luhmann dismissed Parsons' theory, developing a rival approach of his own. His magnum opus, Die Gesellschaft der Gesellschaft ("The Society of Society"), appeared in 1997 and has been subject to much review and critique since.

Segmentary differentiation 
Segmentary differentiation divides parts of the system on the basis of the need to fulfil identical functions over and over.  For instance, a car manufacturer may have functionally similar factories for the production of cars at many different locations. Every location is organized in much the same way; each has the same structure and fulfils the same function – producing cars.

Stratifactory differentiation 
Stratificatory differentiation or social stratification is a vertical differentiation according to rank or status in a system conceived as a hierarchy.  Every rank fulfills a particular and distinct function in the system, for instance the  manufacturing company president, the plant manager, trickling down to the assembly line worker.  In segmentary differentiation inequality is an accidental variance and serves no essential function, however, inequality is systemic in the function of stratified systems.  A stratified system is more concerned with the higher ranks (president, manager) than it is with the lower ranks (assembly worker) with regard to "influential communication."  However, the ranks are dependent on each other and the social system will collapse unless all ranks realize their functions.  This type of system tends to necessitate the lower ranks to initiate conflict in order to shift the influential communication to their level.

Center-periphery differentiation 

Center-periphery differentiation is a link between Segmentary and Stratificatory, an example is again, automobile firms, may have built factories in other countries, nevertheless the headquarters for the company remains the center ruling, and to whatever extent controlling, the peripheral factories.

Functional differentiation 

Functional differentiation is the form that dominates modern society and is also the most complex form of differentiation. All functions within a system become ascribed to a particular unit or site. Again, citing the automobile firm as an example, it may be "functionally differentiated" departmentally, having a production department, administration, accounting, planning, personnel, etc. Functional Differentiation tends to be more flexible than Stratifactory, but just as a stratified system is dependent on all rank, in a Functional system if one part fails to fulfill its task, the whole system will have great difficulty surviving. However, as long as each unit is able to fulfill its separate function, the differentiated units become largely independent; functionally differentiated systems are a complex mixture of interdependence and independence. E.g., the planning division may be dependent on the accounting division for economic data, but so long as the data is accurately compiled the planning division can be ignorant of the methodology involved to collect the data, interdependence yet independence.

Code 

Code is a way to distinguish elements within a system from those elements not belonging to that system. It is the basic language of a functional system. Examples are truth for the science system, payment for the economic system, legality for the legal system; its purpose is to limit the kinds of permissible communication. According to Luhmann a system will only understand and use its own code, and will not understand nor use the code of another system; there is no way to import the code of one system into another because the systems are closed and can only react to things within their environment.

Understanding the risk of complexity 

It is exemplified that in Segmentary differentiation if a segment fails to fulfill its function it does not affect or threaten the larger system. If an auto plant in Michigan stops production this does not threaten the overall system, or the plants in other locations. However, as complexity increases so does the risk of system breakdown. If a rank structure in a Stratified system fails, it threatens the system; a Center-Periphery system might be threatened if the control measure, or the Center/Headquarters failed; and in a Functionally differentiated system, due to the existence of interdependence despite independence the failure of one unit will cause a problem for the social system, possibly leading to its breakdown. The growth of complexity increases the abilities of a system to deal with its environment, but complexity increases the risk of system breakdown. It is important to note that more complex systems do not necessarily exclude less complex systems, in some instances the more complex system may require the existence of the less complex system to function.

Modern social theory 

Luhmann uses the operative distinction between system and environment to determine that society is a complex system which replicates the system/environment distinction to form internal subsystems. Science is among these internally differentiated social systems, and within this system is the sub-system sociology. Here, in the system sociology, Luhmann finds himself again, an observer observing society. His knowledge of society as an internally differentiated system is a contingent observation made from within one of the specialized function-systems he observes. He concludes, therefore, that any social theory claiming universal status must take this contingency into account. Once one uses the basic system/environment distinction, then none of the traditional philosophical or sociological distinctions – transcendental and empirical, subject and object, ideology and science – can eliminate the contingency of enforced selectivity. Thus, Luhmann's theory of social systems breaks not only with all forms of transcendentalism, but with the philosophy of history as well.

Luhmann is criticized as being self-referential and repetitive, this is because a system is forced to observe society from within society. Systems theory, for its part, unfolds this paradox with the notion that the observer observes society from within a subsystem (in this case: sociology) of a subsystem (science) of the social system. Its descriptions are thus "society of society".

Luhmann's critique of political and economic theories of society 

Luhmann felt that the society that thematized itself as political society misunderstood itself. It was simply a social system in which a newly differentiated political subsystem had functional primacy. Luhmann analyzes the Marxist approach to an economy based society: In this theory, the concept of economic society is understood to denote a new type of society in which production, and beyond that "a metabolically founded system of needs" replaces politics as the central social process. From another perspective also characteristic of Marxist thought, the term "bourgeois society" is meant to signify that a politically defined ruling segment is now replaced as the dominant stratum by the owners of property. Luhmann's reservations concerning not only Marxist, but also bourgeois theories of economic society parallel his criticisms of Aristotelian political philosophy as a theory of political society. Both theories make the understandable error of "pars pro toto", of taking the part for the whole, which in this context means identifying a social subsystem with the whole of society. The error can be traced to the dramatic nature of the emergence of each subsystem and its functional primacy (for a time) in relation to the other spheres of society. Nevertheless, the functional primacy claimed for the economy should not have led to asserting an economic permeation of all spheres of life. The notion of the economy possessing functional primacy is compatible with the well-known circumstance that the political subsystem not only grew increasingly differentiated (from religion, morals, and customs if not from the economy) but also continued to increase in size and internal complexity over the course of the entire capitalist epoch. For functional primacy need only imply that the internal complexity of a given subsystem is the greatest, and that the new developmental stage of society is characterized by tasks and problems originating primarily in this sphere.

References

External links 
 The Legacy of Niklas Luhmann
 The World as a Social System
 Contingency and Complexity in the Social Theory of Niklas Luhmann
 Complex Organization and Niklas Luhmann's Sociology of Law

Sociological terminology
Sociological theories